Rahgir (The Traveler) is a Bollywood romantic social drama film. It was released in 1969 and directed by Tarun Majumdar. The film was produced by Geetanjali Pictures and had music by Hemant Kumar. The film had Biswajeet playing the central role of Rahgir where his acting "attracted attention". Costarring with Biswajeet were Sandhya Roy, Shashikala, Kanhaiyalal, Iftekhar, Nirupa Roy and Asit Sen.
The film was based on Angti Chattujjer Vai, a Bengali novel of Manoj Basu.
The story is about Biswajeet playing an impetuous young man in search "for the meaning of life" and is regarded as one of his most credible performances. The movie is a remake of 1963 Bengali movie Palatak.

Cast
 Biswajeet
 Sandhya Roy
 Shashikala
 Kanhaiyalal
 Iftekhar
 Nirupa Roy
 Asit Sen
 Padma
 Vasant Choudhary

Music
The music was composed by Hemant Kumar with lyrics written by Gulzar. The singers were Lata Mangeshkar, Kishore Kumar, Manna Dey, Hemant Kumar, Asha Bhosle, Usha Mangeshkar, Sulakshana Pandit and Aarti Mukherji.

Song list

Awards
The film won the following awards at BFJA.

 BFJA Awards for Best Supporting Actress (Hindi) Shashikala  
 Best Art Direction Robi Chattopadhyay  
 Best Choreography Kanai Dey
 Best Indian Films

References

External links

1969 films
1960s Hindi-language films
Films scored by Hemant Kumar
Films based on Indian novels